Salamiestis Manor is a former residential manor in Salamiestis, Kupiškis District Municipality, Lithuania. Salamiestis Manor is famous for his former grain warehouse, built by peasants, which did not survive until nowadays, however main manor building remained until today and requires reconstruction.

References

Manor houses in Lithuania
Classicism architecture in Lithuania